Men's Super G World Cup 1994/1995

Calendar

Final point standings

In Men's Super G World Cup 1994/95 all results count.

Note:

In the last race only the best racers were allowed to compete and only the best 15 finishers were awarded with points.

World Cup
FIS Alpine Ski World Cup men's Super-G discipline titles